Carmel Robichaud is a politician and retired teacher in New Brunswick, Canada.  She is a member of Legislative Assembly of New Brunswick representing the electoral district of Miramichi Bay-Neguac.

Early life
Born in Neguac, New Brunswick, the daughter of Côme Robichaud, Robichaud's career spanned 35 years from teaching kindergarten to high school, in both official languages. In 1959 she received her Teacher's License from the New Brunswick Teachers' College in Fredericton. She holds a teacher's diploma from the Université de Montreal (1989), a Bachelor of Teaching from St. Thomas University; and a Bachelor of Arts from the Université de Moncton. In 1990, she completed the Principal's In-Service Program in Fredericton and, in 1995, the leadership program at Le Centre de Leadership en Education at the University of Ottawa. In 1997 she received her Master of Education in School Administration from the Université de Moncton. She has been a teacher, a coordinator of the French as a second language and immersion program, a French department head, and a vice-principal. She was also a University professor at Memorial University of Newfoundland and the University of New Brunswick. She has worked in the school systems of the provinces of New Brunswick, Ontario, and Quebec.

Political career
She was first elected to the Legislative Assembly of New Brunswick on June 9, 2003. As the Liberal member for Miramichi Bay, she was the official opposition critic for areas of interest relating to education and the status of women.  She was chair of the Standing Committee on Education.

She was re-elected in 2006 and joined the cabinet.

References 
 MLA Bios, Government of New Brunswick

Living people
Members of the Executive Council of New Brunswick
New Brunswick Liberal Association MLAs
Women MLAs in New Brunswick
21st-century Canadian politicians
21st-century Canadian women politicians
Canadian schoolteachers
Women government ministers of Canada
Year of birth missing (living people)